Koningué is a commune in the Cercle of Koutiala in the Sikasso Region of southern Mali. The commune covers an area of 255 square kilometers and includes 4 settlements. In the 2009 census it had a population of 15,943. The small town of Sougoumba, the administrative centre (chef-lieu) of the commune, is about 40 km southeast of Koutiala.

References

External links
.

Communes of Sikasso Region